Le-Lo L. Lang (born January 23, 1967) is a former professional American football cornerback in the National Football League.

Born and raised in Los Angeles, California, Lang played college football for the University of Washington in Seattle. He was selected by the Denver Broncos in the fifth round of the 1990 NFL Draft (136th overall), and played four seasons for the Broncos.

After retirement, Lang served as an executive with BBVA Compass and president of the Denver Broncos Alumni Association.

References

1967 births
Living people
African-American bankers
American bankers
American football cornerbacks
Denver Broncos players
Players of American football from Los Angeles
Washington Huskies football players
21st-century African-American people
20th-century African-American people